Srinagar railway station is a railway station of the city of Srinagar in the Indian union territory of Jammu and Kashmir.

The station is part of the Jammu–Baramulla line and lies in Firozpur division, which once completed, will connect the city to the rail network of India. Currently, services are to Baramulla and Banihal. The railway line once fully completed is expected to increase tourism and travel to the Kashmir Valley. The work of last leg Chenab Bridge is in final stages and is expected to be completed by 2021.

The station is also planned to be part of a second railway line, the Srinagar–Kargil–Leh line.

History

The station has been built as part of the Jammu–Baramulla line megaproject, intending to link the Kashmir Valley with Jammu Tawi and the rest of the Indian railway network.

Location
The station, in Nowgam, is 8 km from the city centre.
The main hub of stations in Kashmir Is Budgam stations and where all trains are being repaired or any other services.

Design
The station features Kashmiri wood architecture, with an intended ambiance of a royal court which is designed to complement the local surroundings to the station. Station signage is predominantly in Urdu, English and Hindi. The IRCTC intends to build a hotel in close proximity to the site.

See also
 Srinagar International Airport

References 

Railway stations in Srinagar district
Buildings and structures in Srinagar
Railway stations opened in 2008
Transport in Srinagar